Arjun Saud (born 29 June 2003) is a Nepalese cricketer  In August 2022, he was named in Nepal's Twenty20 International (T20I) squad for the their series against Kenya. He made his T20I debut on 28 August 2022, against Kenya.

In November 2022, he was named in Nepal's One Day International (ODI) squad for the their series against United Arab Emirates. He made his ODI debut against United Arab Emirates in Kirtipur, on 14 November 2022.

References

External links
 

2003 births
Living people
Nepalese cricketers
Nepal One Day International cricketers
Nepal Twenty20 International cricketers